Wojciech Kazimierz "Wojtek" Siudmak (born 10 October 1942 in Wieluń) is a Polish painter, currently living in France. He was a student at Academy of Fine Arts in Warsaw. His works are often used as illustrations for science fiction and fantasy literature, including the Polish edition of Frank Herbert's Dune series. He is also known for his work on album covers, including the award-winning cover for Eloy's 1977 album Ocean. Siudmak painted in 1985 a picture Ethernal Love, he continues the subject e.g. in the form of monuments.

Memory of bombing of Wieluń
Wojciech Siudmak was born in Wieluń, later destroyed by bombing, in which his elder brothers were wounded. Siudmak remembers the despair and ugliness of the destroyed town. He wants to memorize the tragedy of 1939.

References

External links
Personal page (in French)

 Wikiart.org
 To ‘Dune’ and beyond: The interstellar hyper-realism of Wojciech Siudmak 

1942 births
20th-century Polish painters
20th-century Polish male artists
21st-century Polish painters
20th-century French painters
French male painters
21st-century French painters
21st-century French male artists
Fantasy artists
Science fiction artists
Living people
People from Wieluń
French speculative fiction artists
Polish speculative fiction artists
Academy of Fine Arts in Warsaw alumni
Polish male painters